Bahavia may refer to:

 A fictional country in the Spawn comic universe, home to Medieval Spawn
 A fictional country in the Disney Channel television series Cory in the House